Season 26 of the television program American Experience was originally shown on the PBS network in the United States from January 7, 2014, and concluded on November 18, 2014. The season contained seven new episodes and began with the film The Poisoner's Handbook.

Episodes

References

2014 American television seasons
American Experience